Sarah Ridley Buchanan ( – 1831), popularly known as Sally Buchanan, was an 18th-century American settler in Tennessee. Credited with helping to defend Buchanan's Station during an attempted raid by Native Americans in 1792, Buchanan was called "the greatest heroine of the West" by writer Elizabeth F. Ellet. Accounts of her life were sometimes embellished with fictional elements.

Early life and marriage 
Sarah Ridley was likely born around 1773 in Watauga, an early settlement in East Tennessee. Her father was Captain George Ridley. According to Ellet, the Ridleys left Watauga in 1779 as part of a large party moving westward, and settled in the area near present-day Nashville, Tennessee, in 1780. The Ridleys' fort where Sarah lived was one of a dozen forts in the area built to protect their inhabitants from frequent attacks by the neighboring Cherokee and Creek Indians.

At the age of eighteen, Sarah married Major John Buchanan, one of the first settlers in the Cumberland Valley. A widower in his thirties, John's first wife Mary (née Kennedy), had died in childbirth. According to writer Harriette Simpson Arnow, Sally Buchanan was said to be larger than most other women in her day, weighing over two hundred pounds. Arnow wrote that Mrs. Buchanan could "pick up, and shoulder a two and one-half bushel sack of corn, or 150 pounds."

Battle of Buchanan's Station 
The Buchanans lived at Buchanan's Station, an enclosure of about one acre with a picketed fence and a blockhouse in each corner. They, and many of the other seven families living there, were slave owners.

Before midnight on September 30, 1792, an estimated 400 Native American raiders attacked Buchanan's Station, but were thwarted in their attempt to breach the stockade walls.

According to Arnow, Sally Buchanan carried bullets in her apron and distributed them to the settlers who were defending the fort, at great risk to her own safety despite being heavily pregnant, and also supplied them with whiskey. Other accounts claim she led a group of women in acting as sentinels and loading guns; molding bullets from plates and spoons when they started running out of ammunition; and even firing on a few Native American raiders.

Later life and legacy 
Buchanan gave birth to her first child eleven days after the battle of Buchanan's Station. She went on to have twelve more children, including eight sons and four daughters. Both she and her husband were buried in Davidson County, Tennessee.

In the mid-20th century, the Tennessee Historical Commission set up a brass plaque commemorating "Mrs. Buchanan" near the historical site of Buchanan's Station in Davidson County. The story of Sally Buchanan was told in History of Middle Tennessee by Stanley Horn, Tales of Perils and Adventures of Tennessee Pioneers by Octavia Bond, and Seedtime on the Cumberland and Flowering of the Cumberland by Harriette Arnow.

Notes

References 

1831 deaths
18th-century American women
19th-century American women
People from Tennessee
1773 births